Herbertaceae is a family of liverworts. The family consists of the genera Herbertus, Schisma and Triandrophyllum. The genus Herpocladium  has been merged into Herbertus.

Genera
As accepted by GBIF;
 Herbertus  (107 species)
 Schisma  (15 species)
 Triandrophyllum  (10)

References

Jungermanniales
Liverwort families